Belonimorphis cubensis is a species of sea snail, a gastropod in the family Cerithiopsidae. It was described by Rolán and Espinosa, in 1992.

Description 
The maximum recorded shell length is 3.5 mm.

Habitat 
Minimum recorded depth is 10 m. Maximum recorded depth is 30 m.

References

 Rolán E. & Espinosa J. (1992) La familia Cerithiopsidae H. y A. Adams, 1853 (Mollusca, Gastropoda), en la isla de Cuba. 2. El genero Horologica Laseron, 1956. Publicacoes Ocasionais da Sociedade Portuguesa de Malacologia 16: 45-50
 Cecalupo A. & Perugia I. (2020). Report on the Cerithiopsidae from Guadeloupe, Martinique and French Guiana (Caenogastropoda, Triphoroidea). Visaya. suppl. 14: 1-103.

Cerithiopsidae
Gastropods described in 1992